Believers is the eighth studio album released by Scottish band Deacon Blue, released on 30 September 2016 via both EarMusic and Sheer Sound recording labels. The album was a commercial success in the United Kingdom, debuting at number thirteen and remained in the UK Albums Chart for a further week, making Believers Deacon Blue's seventh Top 40 UK album. In their native Scotland, Believers debuted at number four on the Scottish Albums Chart.

Background
The album serves as the band's follow up to their 2014 effort, A New House which performed well in international album charts and spawned a number of single releases. Whilst previous efforts had been successful for Deacon Blue and the band enjoying a surge again in popularity in Europe, Believers became Deacon Blue's highest charting album in twenty three years in the United Kingdom.

Track listing

Standard edition

Chart performance

See also
 Deacon Blue discography

References

2016 albums
Deacon Blue albums